NASCAR Beyond the Wheel is a documentary program that aired on Speed Channel in the 2005 and 2006 seasons.

The program was produced by NASCAR Images and mixed film footage, audio from the Fox/FX and NBC/TNT telecasts and the radio broadcasts from Motor Racing Network, Performance Racing Network, and Indianapolis Motor Speedway Radio Network. In addition, a key driver and/or crew chief was interviewed each week. Late in the show's run, the driver interview was almost always with the race winner.

George Lee was the narrator in 2005 and the start of 2006, but Lee died in 2006.  Jim Birdsall, who has also been heard on NFL Films, took over during the 2006 season.

NASCAR Beyond the Wheel, as well as 7 Days, were cancelled by Speed Channel after the 2006 season finale at Homestead-Miami Speedway.  (Another related show on the network, NBS 24/7, had been canned in June.)

On April 30, 2007, NASCAR Beyond the Wheel won the Sports Emmy Award for Outstanding Live Event Turnaround program.

See also
NASCAR on television and radio

References

Beyond the Wheel
2005 American television series debuts
2006 American television series endings
Speed (TV network) original programming